Kim Chol-ho (born 15 October 1985) is a retired North Korean international football player. Kim played the defensive position. He played for Pyongyang Sports Club] between 2005 and 2015.

Kim was born in Pyongyang.

International goals
Goals for Senior National Team

References

External links

Kim Chol-ho at DPRKFootball

Living people
North Korean footballers
North Korea international footballers
Pyongyang Sports Club players
1985 births
Amnokgang Sports Club players
Footballers at the 2006 Asian Games
Association football defenders
Asian Games competitors for North Korea